Arne Nielsson (born May 11, 1962) is a Danish sprint canoer who competed from the late 1980s to the late 1990s. Competing in three Summer Olympics, he won a silver medal in the C-2 1000 m event at Barcelona in 1992.

Nielsson also won eight medals at the ICF Canoe Sprint World Championships with six golds (C-2 1000 m: 1989, 1993; C-2 10000 m: 1987, 1989, 1990, 1993), one silver (C-2 500 m: 1993), and one bronze (C-2 10000 m: 1986).

Since his retirement from elite sports, Arne Nielsson has worked as a professional coach and he has been writing several books about cognitive coaching and mental training with hint to sportspeople as well as business people.

References

1962 births
Canoeists at the 1988 Summer Olympics
Canoeists at the 1992 Summer Olympics
Canoeists at the 1996 Summer Olympics
Danish male canoeists
Living people
Olympic canoeists of Denmark
Olympic silver medalists for Denmark
Olympic medalists in canoeing
ICF Canoe Sprint World Championships medalists in Canadian
Medalists at the 1992 Summer Olympics